Nirvana Street Murder is a 1990 Australian comedy film, written and directed by Aleksi Vellis, starring Mark Little, Ben Mendelsohn, Sheila Florance, Mary Coustas and Russell Gilbert.

See also
Cinema of Australia

References

External links

Nirvana Street Murder at the National Film and Sound Archive
Nirvana Street Murder at Oz Movies

1990 films
Australian comedy films
1990 comedy films
Films shot in Melbourne
1990s English-language films
1990s Australian films